Ltava is the name of a settlement mentioned in the Hypatian Chronicle, traditionally connected to the name of the city of Poltava, Ukraine.

Now it is also the trademark (manufacture and sales) of food products (snacks, mayonnaise, mustard, vinegar) originating from Poltava.

It is also the name of the radio station Radio "Ltava"  (FM)  broadcasting from Poltava.

History of Poltava Oblast